India's Next Top Model, season 3 is the third instalment of India's Next Top Model which premiered October 21st, 2017 at 7:00 pm IST (UTC+5:30) on MTV India. The season 3 judgres were Malaika Arora, Milind Soman and Dabboo Ratnani.

The winner of the competition was 20 year-old Riya Subodh from Ahmedabad, who was awarded a one-year talent contract with MTV India.

Cast

Contestants

Judges and mentors 
 Malaika Arora - presenter / head judge
 Milind Soman - judge
 Dabboo Ratnani - judge
 Neeraj Gaba - mentor and image consultant

Episodes

Episode 1: Casting
Original airdate: 

This was the casting episode. The 16 semi-finalist had a runway show at Club Sirkus, Mumbai for designer Gabriella Demetriades. Later, one by one had an interwiew with the judges.

Episode 2: Posing
Original airdate: 

The top sixteen semi-finalists were narrowed down to the top 10 who moved into the model villa. Then remaining contestants had a challenge where they were paired up and had a photo shoot on stilts. Erika Packard was a guest mentor for this photo shoot. The pairs were Eva & Parina, Aakriti & Akanksha, Summer & Madhurima, Bhanu & Sabita and Shweta & Riya. After that the girls had an Underwater photo shoot with male model and judge Milind Soman. Each girl got only 3 dives. As Aakriti & Akanksha won the challenge, they got a special advantage by having 4 dives but that to steal 1 dive from one of the fellow models. Akanksha chose Eva & Aakriti chose Bhanu.

First call-out: Summer Jacobs
Bottom two: Aakriti Singh & Bhanu Chaudhary
Eliminated: Bhanu Chaudhary
Featured photographer: Dabboo Ratnani

Episode 3: Runway
Original airdate: 

Trainer Alesia Raut  was a guest mentor to train the models for a runway challenge on a 10-inch runway in the water and had to take a selfie using OPPO phone kept at the end of the ramp. As the winner of the challenge Sabita was allowed to choose any 3 girls to give a disadvantage at the next shoot. She chose Eva, Aakriti & Summer. On set the models had a jewelry beauty shoot using balding caps while holding iguanas. The girls with disadvantage had to shoot with two iguanas instead of one like the other contestants.

First call-out: Riya Subodh
Bottom two: Aakriti Singh & Madhurima Rao
Eliminated: Madhurima Rao

Episode 4: Makeover
Original airdate: 

A new contestant, Tanishq, entered the competition. During this episode, makeovers occurred. After makeovers the contestants had a free fall photo shoot.

First call-out: Shweta Raj
Bottom three: Akanksha Corda & Tanishq Sharma
Eliminated: None

Episode 5: Chemistry
Original airdate: 

This week the girls had a challenge photo shoot in pairs. The pairs were Aakrati & Tej, Parina & Jay, Eva & Mandeep, Shweta & Mohit, Nikhil & Riya, Sabita & Akash and Akansha & Baseer. Summer & Tanishq were left out and had to pair up with each other. Riya won immunity for this week's elimination for winning the challenge. On set the models had a photoshoot with Amante lingerie and posing on the pole.

First call-out: Riya Subodh
Bottom three: Sabita Karki, Summer Jacobs & Tanishq Sharma
Eliminated: Tanishq Sharma & Summer Jacobs
Special guests: Tej Gill, Akash Chaudhary, Nikhil Sachdeva, Mohit Hiranandani, Jay Bodas, Baseer Ali, Mandeep Gujjar

Episode 6: Expressions
Original airdate: 

This week the girls had a challenge photo shoot as cowgirl and Parina win the challenge. On set the models had a commercial for Livon Serum in pair.

First call-out: Parina Chopra & Riya Subodh
Bottom two: Aakriti Singh & Eva Aario
Eliminated: Aakriti Singh
Featured photographer:

Episode 7: Editorial & Commercial
Original airdate: 

This week the girls had a challenge photo shoot for Livon Serum and Parina win the challenge, After challenge, Neeraj ask the girl who should not remained in the competition. On set the models had a sexy photoshoot that they bodies covered in chocolate and pose with male model. Because Eva & Riya were the most voted, they had to pose together.

First call-out: Parina Chopra
Bottom two: Akanksha Corda & Sabita Karki
Eliminated: Akanksha Corda
Featured photographer:

Episode 8: Top 5
Original airdate: 

The remaining 5 had an OPPO selfie challenge, Shweta won and win an OPPO Phone. Later, they had a runway challenge on a cowhouse. As the winner of the challenge, Shweta became the first finalist in the finale. On set the models had a glamorous shoot with Malaika Arora.

Ticket to Finale: Shweta Raj (Immune from elimination)
First call-out: Sabita Karki
Bottom three: Eva Aario, Parina Chopra & Riya Subodh
Eliminated: Eva Aario &  Parina Chopra

Episode 9: Finale
Original Airdate: 

The remaining 3 had a photoshoot for OPPO calendar 2018. Later, they had the last photoshoot with family member. They had a final runway show in the judging room. At the end, Riya became India's Next Top Model.

Final 3: Riya Subodh, Sabita Karki & Shweta Raj
Eliminated: Shweta Raj
Final 2: Riya Subodh & Sabita Karki
India's Next Top Model: Riya Subodh

Episode 10: Recap
Original Airdate: 

This was a recap episode.

Summaries

Call-out order

 The contestant was eliminated
 The contestant was in a non-elimination bottom three
 The contestant was immune from elimination
 The contestant won the competition

Photo shoot guide
Episode 1 runway show: Gabriella Demetriades collection
Episode 2 photo shoot: Posing underwater with Milind Soman
Episode 3 photo shoot: Bald jewelry beauty shoot with iguanas
Episode 4 photo shoot: Falling from a skyscraper
Episode 5 photo shoot: Posing with a pole in Amante lingerie
Episode 6 commercial: Livon Serum
Episode 7 photo shoots: Livon Serum campaign; chocolate romance
Episode 8 photo shoot: Glamour with Malaika Arora
Episode 9 photo shoot: Final photo with family

References

External links
Official website

2010s Indian television series
2017 Indian television seasons
Top Model